Octotoma championi, known generally as the lantana leafminer or lantana leaf beetle, is a species of leaf beetle in the family Chrysomelidae. It is found in Central America, North America, and Africa.

References

Further reading

 
 
 

Cassidinae
Articles created by Qbugbot
Beetles described in 1886
Beetles of Central America
Beetles of North America
Beetles of Africa